Pandijazz, also known as "Los Pequeños Gigantes del Jazz", was founded in 2010 in Barquisimeto, Lara State. It is the only jazz band of children in Venezuela. The school has about 20 members between the ages of 6 and 16 years old.

Biography
Pandijazz was founded by Norbelis Lameda. Currently the President of Pandijazz is Mrs. Darisol Hernandez Rojas and the Musical Director is Fausto Castillo Paradas. Through dialogue with music teachers and enthusiasts, the city of Barquisimeto decided to form a jazz group for children. The young band members soon developed a profound interest for jazz. The band itself had made itself better known through social media. Their appearance at the fifth edition of Festival Internacional de Jazz en Barquisimeto, brought considerable attention to the project. The President of the Festival Internacional de Jazz en Barquisimeto, Ms. Zuly Perdomo, encouraged the kids to develop a repertoire of compositions by Duke Ellington, Thelonious Monk, Antônio Carlos Jobim and others.

The band has become very popular, and had performed at concerts. They are presented every year at the Festival Internacional de Jazz en Barquisimeto. They also offer educational activities for kids. The band opened the concert of Linda Briceño at the jazz festival PDVSA STAY (PDVSA La Estancia) in Caracas, and was the only children’s group selected for a workshop with Wynton Marsalis and the Lincoln Center Orchestra in 2015. The group also appeared at Merida Jazz Festival.

In 2017 and 2018, Pandijazz had participated in Oslo, Norway in concerts and the International Jazz Festivals. The norwegian director of Barnas Jazzhus, Odd André Elveland, had invited 3 girls of Pandijazz who are María Estefany Ortega Santa Marta, Gabriela Rengifo Aponte and Niccole Meza Ramos.

References

Jazz music education
Music schools in Venezuela